Flight Facilities is an Australian electronic producer duo that also performs as Hugo & Jimmy. In 2009, they began mixing songs by other artists before crafting their own original material. The duo consists of Hugo Gruzman and James Lyell. Their debut album Down to Earth was released in October 2014 and features prominent names in the industry such as Kylie Minogue, Emma Louise, Reggie Watts, Bishop Nehru, Christine Hoberg, Owl Eyes, and Stee Downes.

History

2009–2020: Down to Earth and Live with the Melbourne Symphony Orchestra

Flight Facilities are a duo consisting of Hugo Gruzman and James Lyell, which first began mixing various songs by other artists in 2009 in Sydney. They have reworked Bag Raiders, Toecutter and Sneaky Sound System. Their first original song, "Crave You", written by and featuring Giselle Rosselli, received considerable airtime in Australia on the alternative music radio station Triple J in 2010. It was co-written by Gruzman, Lyell and Rosselli after the duo contacted the musician/producer to provide an original track for a compilation album by their label Bang Gang. In July 2010 Flight Facilities commenced their first tour, Maiden Voyage. They played at various Australian nightclubs: Elsewhere in the Gold Coast, Empire in Brisbane, Limbo in Adelaide, and Adult Disco in Sydney before going to Japan to play at Onzieme in Osaka, and Le Baron in Tokyo. "Crave You" was listed at No. 19 in the Triple J Hottest 100, 2010, and was featured as the soundtrack to Myer's 2010 Spring Racing Carnival television commercial campaign.

In 2011, "Foreign Language" was nominated for a J-Award for its music video, and appeared as number 72 in the Triple J Hottest 100, 2011. In February that year while performing as Hugo & Jimmy in Jakarta, Indonesia, the duo claimed to be from Trinidad and Tobago. They have jokingly told journalists the same thing and that they are Calvin Harris.

In 2012, "Clair de Lune" appeared as number 17 in the Triple J Hottest 100, 2012. In April 2012, they were broadcast on Triple J with four one-hour-long mixes, each featuring a decade spanning from 1972 to 2012.

In 2013, KCRW invited Flight Facilities to SXSW and headlined their home countries Falls Festival and Southbound Festivals (alongside The Roots, !!!, MGMT, Bonobo and Grizzly Bear). In 2014 they were asked to play one of the world's biggest festivals, Coachella Music and Arts Festival in Palm Springs where they played to 8000 plus people each day.

The C90s track "Shine a Light" (Flight Facilities remix) gained mainstream attention in 2013 when featured in the popular video game Grand Theft Auto V, created by Rockstar Games.

In 2014, "Two Bodies" (featuring Emma Louise) appeared as number 39 and "Sunshine" (Ft. Reggie Watts) as number 52 in the Triple J Hottest 100, 2014. On 24 October 2014, they issued their debut album, Down to Earth, which reached No. 3 on the ARIA Albums Chart. It received a gold certification from ARIA by the end of the following year.

In 2015, Down to Earth was made into a music video starring Sam Rockwell. At the ARIA Music Awards that year, Flight Facilities were nominated in three categories: Album of the Year, Best Pop Release and Best Cover Art (by Timothy Lovett) for Down to Earth.

In December 2015 Flight Facilities released a live album following their performance with the Melbourne Symphony Orchestra. The album consisted of tracks from the duo's debut album as well as previous releases. It won the ARIA Award for Best Classical Album at the ARIA Music Awards of 2016.

In 2017, Flight Facilities released the song "Arty Boy", featuring Emma Louise on vocals, followed by the single "Stranded", featuring Broods, Reggie Watts and Saro.

In November 2019, Google began a YouTube campaign for Google Nest products using Flight Facilities "Better Than Ever".

2021: Forever

In September 2021, Flight Facilities announced the release of their second studio album, titled Forever. The album was released on 12 November 2021, with a single called "Heavy" featuring the American artist Your Smith, released a week before the album was due.

In November 2022, Flight Facilities released a two-track EP titled Lost Forever.

Discography

Studio albums

Live albums

Extended plays

Singles

Notes

Awards and nominations

AIR Awards
The Australian Independent Record Awards (known colloquially as the AIR Awards) is an annual awards night to recognise, promote and celebrate the success of Australia's independent music sector.

! 
|-
! scope="row"| 2013
| "Clair de Lune"
| Best Independent Dance / Electronic Single or EP
| 
| 
|-
! scope="row" rowspan="2"| 2015
| rowspan="2"| Down to Earth
| Best Independent Album
| 
| rowspan="2"|
|-
| Best Independent Dance / Electronic Album
| 
|-
! scope="row"|  2022
| Forever
| Best Independent Dance or Electronica Album or EP
|  
| 
|-
|}

APRA Awards
The APRA Awards are presented annually from 1982 by the Australasian Performing Right Association (APRA), "honouring composers and songwriters". They commenced in 1982.

! 
|-
| 2013 
| "Clair de Lune" (Hugo Gruzman and James Lyell)
| Song of the Year
| 
| 
|-

ARIA Music Awards
The ARIA Music Awards is an annual awards ceremony that recognises excellence, innovation, and achievement across all genres of Australian music. Flight Facilities have won one award from 5 nominations.

! 
|-
! scope="row"| 2013
| "Clair de Lune"
| Best Video
| 
| 
|-
! scope="row" rowspan="3"| 2015
| rowspan="2"| Down to Earth
| Album of the Year
| 
| 
|-
| Best Dance Release
| 
| 
|-
| Timothy Lovett for Down to Earth
| Best Cover Art
|  
| 
|-
! scope="row"| 2016
| Live with the Melbourne Symphony Orchestra
| Best Classical Album
| 
| 
|}

J Award
The J Awards are an annual series of Australian music awards that were established by the Australian Broadcasting Corporation's youth-focused radio station Triple J. They commenced in 2005.

! 
|-
! scope="row"| 2012
| "Foreign Language"
| Australian Video of the Year
| 
| 
|-
! scope="row"| 2014
| Down to Earth
| Australian Album of the Year
| 
| 
|}

Helpmann Awards
The Helpmann Awards is an awards show, celebrating live entertainment and performing arts in Australia, presented by industry group Live Performance Australia since 2001. Note: 2020 and 2021 were cancelled due to the COVID-19 pandemic.
 

! 
|-
| 2016
| Flight Facilities Perform Live with Melbourne Symphony Orchestra''
| Helpmann Award for Best Australian Contemporary Concert
| 
|
|-

References

External links
 

2013 establishments in Australia
Australian electronic musicians
ARIA Award winners
Future Classic artists
Glassnote Records artists
Musical groups established in 2013